María Luz Cipriota  (born September 6, 1985), known professionally as Luz Cipriota, is an Argentine actress, classic dancer and model.

Career 
She began her career as a film actress in 2006 starring in the film Deficit, directed by Gael García Bernal in Mexico. That same year she worked on television impersonating Clara in the telenovela El Refugio, later she participated in programs such as Reinas Magas, Almost Angels and Valentino, the Argentine.

In 2009 she starred in the telenovela Herencia de amor, in which she plays Verónica Cabañas.

A year later she participated in the Unitary Life Decisions. In 2012, the RAI chain summoned her to be part of the second season of the Italian miniseries Terra ribelle. During that year and until 2013 he was part of the cast of the telenovela Sos mi hombre. In July of that year, she made a special appearance in the telecomedy The Neighbors at War.

Her film debut took place in 2006 when she starred in Deficit, the first film directed by Gael García Bernal. Later she appeared in films such as No Polo Widow by Blake Mycoskie, Histórias de Amor Duram Barely 90 Minutos by Paulo Halm, Desmadre by Jazmín Stuart and Still Life by Gabriel Grieco.

In 2014 she starred alongside Mariano Torre in the miniseries Coma on Public TV, 6 that same year she had a participation in Tu cara me suena 2. In 2015 she played Jessi in Socios por Accidente 2. In 2016, she played both Tamara in the series Soy Luna as Altea in series 2091, that same year she acted in the Italian film Onda Su Onda where she stars alongside Alessandro Gassmann and Rocco Papaleo speaking in Italian. In 2017, Cipriota played Bianca, Paulina's (Inés Estévez) girlfriend on Channel 13's unit, El Maestro.

In 2018, she joined the third season of Cable Girls, an original series on the Netflix platform. In it she plays the Argentine wife of Uribe, the owner of the telephone company.

Filmography

Theater performances

Awards and nominations

References 

Living people
1985 births
Argentine dancers
Argentine female models
Actresses from Buenos Aires
21st-century Argentine actresses